Jonathan Kieser "Poss" Miller (1899 – August 22, 1971) was an American football player and coach.  He played college football at the University of Pennsylvania as a quarterback, captaining the 1922 Penn Quakers football team.  Miller served as the head football coach at Franklin & Marshall College from 1928 to 1930, compiling a record of 15–11–1.

Playing career
Miller played college football for the University of Pennsylvania in Philadelphia, Pennsylvania, from 1920 to 1922 under coach John Heisman.  Miller was the team captain in 1922.

Miller also played the last five games of the 1923 football season for the Frankford Yellow Jackets where his brother Heinie was a member of the squad.

Coaching career
Miller became the head football coach at Franklin & Marshall College in Lancaster, Pennsylvania.  He held that position there for three seasons, from 1928 until 1930.  His coaching record at Franklin & Marshall was 15–11–1.

Death
Miller died at the age of 71, on August 22, 1971, at Delaware County Memorial Hospital in Drexel Hill, Pennsylvania.

Head coaching record

References

External links
 

1899 births
1971 deaths
American football quarterbacks
Franklin & Marshall Diplomats football coaches
Penn Quakers football coaches
Penn Quakers football players
People from Lebanon, Pennsylvania
Coaches of American football from Pennsylvania
Players of American football from Pennsylvania